Zadik–Barak–Levin syndrome (ZBLS) is a congenital disorder in humans. Presenting conditions include primary hypothyroidism, cleft palate, hypodontia, and ectodermal dysplasia. It is the result of an embryonic defect in the mesodermal-ectodermal midline development.

Signs and symptoms

Diagnosis

Management

References

 Zadik, Z. and Y. Barak, S. Levin, Z. Josephberg, J. Lustmann, J. Chemke. "Dermoid cysts, hyperthyroidism, cleft palate, and hypodontia," J. Clin. Dysmorphol., 1983 Winter, 1(4):24–7.
 Zadik Barak Levin syndrome, About rare diseases, Orphanet.

Further reading

External links 

Congenital disorders
Rare diseases
Syndromes